Zante Plantation was a historic plantation house located near Fort Motte, Calhoun County, South Carolina. It was built about 1815, and is a -story frame structure with Federal details. Both front and rear facades have one-story porches. Several original outbuildings remain on the property. Zante has been the home of several prominent South Carolinians, its history reaching as far back as the late-18th century.

It was in severe disrepair due to neglect and vandalism and was demolished in 2016.
It was listed in the National Register of Historic Places in 1976.

References

Plantation houses in South Carolina
Houses on the National Register of Historic Places in South Carolina
Federal architecture in South Carolina
Houses completed in 1815
Houses in Calhoun County, South Carolina
National Register of Historic Places in Calhoun County, South Carolina
Demolished buildings and structures in South Carolina
Buildings and structures demolished in 2016